Giovanni Assenza, born in Ragusa on February 22, 1948, is an Italian lawyer.

Biography

GA pursued classical studies at "Liceo classico Umberto I" in Ragusa and obtained a degree in law from the University of Catania in 1976. The same year he became an official of the Ministry of Justice. From 1981 to 1989 he directed the bankruptcy and commercial section of the Court of Ragusa, and since 1989 he has directed the public prosecutor office of Ragusa.

From 1992 to 1996 he served as manager of the Court of Modica, from 1996 to 1998 as manager of Court of Appeal in Catania, and, from 1998 to July 2007, he was appointed director of the Public Prosecutor office in Ragusa. In 2007, Giovanni Assenza was called to the Bar in the forum of Ragusa.

Giovanni Assenza has also carried out teaching work in the school training of the Ministry of Justice, with regard to administrative law, science organisation, public accounting, privacy and information technology.

He is a founder member of the Associazione Dirigenti Giustizia, where he served as chairman, vice chairman and member of the Governing Council. From 2001 to August 2007, he served as General Secretary of the European Union of Rechtspfleger, which appointed him a member of honour during a congress in Stockholm on August 30, 2007.

Giovanni Assenza is member of the Rotary Club of Ragusa and was made a Paul Harris Fellow by the Rotary Foundation of Rotary International.

External links
Associazione Dirigenti Giustizia
E.U.R. European Union of Rechtspfleger
Rotary Club of Ragusa

1948 births
Living people
People from Ragusa, Sicily
20th-century Italian lawyers
Jurists from Sicily